Gale Tracy Christiane Rigobert is a Saint Lucian politician, former Minister for Education, Innovation, Gender Relations and Sustainable Development. She is the former representative for Micoud North constituency in the House of Assembly.

Biography 
She served as deputy political leader of the United Workers Party. She won her seat in the 2011 general election. Rigobert was a member of the Saint Lucian Senate. She is a former lecturer at the University of the West Indies.
On the 1st February 2014, she became Leader of the Opposition for the United Workers Party. In June 2016, she was appointed Minister of Education, Innovation, Gender Relations and Sustainable Development.

When Minister for Education, Innovation, Gender Relations, and Sustainable Development, she assumed her seat as the Co-Chair of the Governing Board of the Risk-informed Early Action Partnership (REAP). The REAP brings together a range of stakeholders across the climate, humanitarian, and development communities with the aim of making 1 billion people safer from disaster by 2025.

Dr Rigobert is the author of the book – “Bridging the Digital Divide? Prospects for Caribbean Development in the New Techno-economic Paradigm”.

References

External links
Dr. Gale T C Rigobert biography on the United Workers Party website archived from the original

Year of birth missing (living people)
Living people
Alumni of the University of Cambridge
Members of the House of Assembly of Saint Lucia
Members of the Senate of Saint Lucia
United Workers Party (Saint Lucia) politicians
University of the West Indies academics
University of the West Indies alumni
21st-century Saint Lucian women politicians
21st-century Saint Lucian politicians